William Calhoun "Will" Newland (October 8, 1860 – November 18, 1938) was an attorney who served a term as the 11th  Lieutenant Governor of North Carolina (1909–1913).

A Democrat, Newland had previously served as mayor of his hometown, Lenoir, North Carolina, and was elected to terms in the North Carolina Senate (1881–1882) and in the North Carolina House of Representatives (1889–1890, 1903–1904). While in the General Assembly, Newland introduced and sponsored the bill that established Appalachian State University.
In 1904, Newland lost a close race for Congress to E. Spencer Blackburn.

The town of Newland, North Carolina was named after him as part of a political deal to secure his aid in passage of the bill that established Avery County in 1911. Newland is the seat of Avery County.

References

1860 births
1938 deaths
Lieutenant Governors of North Carolina
Democratic Party members of the North Carolina House of Representatives
Democratic Party North Carolina state senators
North Carolina lawyers
People from Lenoir, North Carolina